Spookydisharmoniousconflicthellride is the only studio album by the Chicago-based punk band Wesley Willis Fiasco, produced by Steve Albini and released in 1996 through Urban Legends Records with distribution through Unity Label Group.

Track listing 
 Get On The Bus
 I'm Doing It Well On The Side Of The Rea
 Pop That Pussy
 Casper The Homosexual Friendly Ghost
 I Can't Drive
 He's Doing Time In Jail
 The Bar Is Closed
 Jesus Is The Answer
 Blood, Guts & Fire Trucks
 She Loves Me Truly
 Drink That Whiskey
 Steve Albini
 Steve Albini Reprise
 I'm Sorry That I Got Fat

References

1996 debut albums
Wesley Willis Fiasco albums